Nemacheilus drassensis is a species of ray-finned fish in the genus Nemacheilus, although some authorities place it in Triplophysa.

References
 

D
Fish described in 1990